Félix Lancís Sánchez (November 20, 1900 – 1976) was a Cuban politician and Prime Minister of Cuba.

He was a lawyer, who served as Senator, Minister of Education and was twice Prime Minister of Cuba (1944–1945 and 1950–1951).  He was married to Carmelina Barba.  He died in Havana, Cuba, aged 75.

References
Fulgencio Batista, From Revolutionary to Strongman (Rutgers University Press, 2006)
 Anuario Social de La Habana 1939, (Luz-Hilo, S.A.) 
 Directorio Social de La Habana 1948, (P. Fernandez y Cia, S. en C.) 
 Libro de Oro de la Sociedad Habanera 1949, (Editorial Lex) 
 Libro de Oro de la Sociedad Habanera 1950, (Editorial Lex) 
 Registro Social de La Habana 1958, (Molina y Cia, S.A.) 
  (Spanish)

Prime Ministers of Cuba
Cuban senators
1900 births
1976 deaths
1940s in Cuba
1950s in Cuba
20th-century Cuban lawyers
20th-century Cuban politicians
Education ministers of Cuba